The First Armenian Evangelical Church (Հայ Աւետարանական Ա. Եկեղեցի) is the first church founded in Lebanon by Armenian Evangelicals, in February 1922. It is located at the heart of Beirut, Mexique Street, Kantari. It serves the Armenian community by holding worship services and supports Yeprem and Martha Pilibossian Armenian Evangelical College since 1943. Its current pastor is Reverend Jirair Ghazarian.

History
Many Armenian Evangelicals who had settled in Beirut during the years 1914-1918 held worship services in the Dale Memorial Hall of the Presbyterian Mission. In February 1922, a Church board was elected, being the first step towards the establishment of a church. Between the years 1922 and 1926 a large number of Armenian refugees that had survived the Armenian genocide settled in Beirut and lived in the outskirts of the city under extremely poor conditions. At that time the number of Evangelicals reached 2000, while the number of communicant members was 670. For some time two churches were operating under the name of Armenian Evangelical First Church- one in East Beirut and one in West Beirut. In 1926 these two churches started to function independently of each other, and the church functioning in the outskirts of Beirut later moved to Ashrafieh.
The First Armenian Evangelical Church had 103 families ( a total of 488 individuals) and 150 communicant members. Until 1949 they held their services in different places. In that year, the church bought a property on Mexique Street and the building of a sanctuary took about 10 years.

Important dates in the church history
 Early 19th century: Armenian families settle in Beirut
 1848: 5 out of 27 members of the Arabic Evangelical Church of Beirut are Armenians
 1914-1918: worship services are held in the Dale Memorial Hall
 1922 February: Dr. H. Salibian, Pastor P. Gaydzagian, S. Kerkiasharian, and L. Salibian are elected to form the church board
 1922 February 19: Rev. Yenovk Hadidian becomes the pastor
 1922 July: the church elects its 2 deacons: Mr. Minas Faradjian and Mr. Dikran Gulesserian
 1922 October: the school opens
 1922-1926: two churches operate under the name First Armenian Evangelical Church
 1925: Christian Endeavor Young-Adults Association is formed, Rev. S. Manougian is the leader
 1926: The two churches separate
 1927: Rev. Yenovk Geukgeuzian becomes the pastor

Pastors over the years
The pastors who have served the church are:
 Rev. Yenovk Hadidian (1922–1926)
 Rev. Yenovk Guekguezian (1927–1946)
 Rev. Garabed Tilkian (1946–1967)
 Rev. Robert Sarkissian (assistant 1967–1970)
 Rev. Soghomon Nuyujukian (1967–1974)
 Rev. Ardashes Kerbabian (1974–1976)
 Rev. Manuel Jinbashian (1978–1979)
 Rev. Hovhannes Karjian (1979–1988, 1991–1995)
 Rev. Hagop Sagherian (1988–1991)
 Rev. Hovhannes Sevadjian (1995–2005)
 Rev. Hagop Sarkissian (2007-2010)
 Rev. Hrayr Cholakian (2011-2021)
 Pastor Jirair Ghazarian (2021-...)

Youth groups and associations
The First Armenian Evangelical Church has had Ladies' Society, Youth groups for juniors and seniors as well as Sunday School since it was founded. In the recent years, two new groups emerged:the young couples' group that meets every 2 months and organizes activities. The Armenian Evangelical Cultural Association (AECA)was founded on October 5, 2006, by a group of young people from the First Armenian Evangelical Church, acting in response to a scarcity of organized cultural, social, sports, political-related and work-related activities in the First Armenian Evangelical Church community. The founding members were: Luder Artinian, Shushan Artinian, Ara Kojadelian, Rosy Sailian, and Armen Waijian.

The AECA functions officially, under the auspices of the First Armenian Evangelical Church and on its premises. AECA has its constitution and bylaws as well as its logo and motto:"To be is to dare; to dare is to be."  The AECA meets regularly for discussion on chosen topics. It also organizes public events such as public discussions, sport events, gatherings and such.
AECA publishes its 'Tertig' 
newsletter two times per year reporting news that concerns the Armenian Evangelical community and interviewing well-known figures who are Evangelical, brought up in an Evangelical atmosphere or serve the Evangelical community.

References

External links
Facebook
 Official blog site

Armenian churches in Lebanon
Evangelical denominations established in the 19th century
Armenian Evangelical churches
Protestant churches in Lebanon
Churches in Beirut